The 1917 Oklahoma Sooners football team represented the University of Oklahoma in the 1917 college football season. In their 13th year under head coach Bennie Owen, the Sooners compiled a 6–4–1 record (1–1–1 against conference opponents), and outscored their opponents by a combined total of 451 to 103.

No Sooners were recognized as All-Americans.

Two Sooner received All-Southwest Conference honors: Walt Abbott and W.E. Durant.

Schedule

References

Oklahoma
Oklahoma Sooners football seasons
Oklahoma Sooners football